The New York state high school boys basketball championships are won in the Federation Tournament of Champions, which is conducted annually by the New York State Federation of Secondary School Athletic Associations (NYSFSSAA).  The tournament comprises the winners of the various high school athletic associations in New York:

New York State Public High School Athletic Association (NYSPHSAA) (public schools outside of New York City) (which qualifies in the NYSPHSAA Tournament)
Public Schools Athletic League (PSAL) (public schools in New York City)
Catholic High School Athletic Association (CHSAA) (Catholic schools primarily in Buffalo, New York City, Long Island, and Westchester)
New York State Association of Independent Schools Athletic Association (NYSAISAA)

For geographic reasons, some Catholic and independent schools in upstate New York and Long Island compete in the NYSPHSAA.

The championship games are held each March. The 2020 tournament was cancelled due to the coronavirus pandemic.

History
Following a 45-year ban on high school basketball state championship tournaments in New York State, the State Education Department granted approval in 1978 for the first boys Federation tournament to be conducted on an experimental basis. The original boys tournament was named the Super Sixteen tournament, as the four associations (NYSPHSAA, PSAL, CHSAA and NYSAISAA) competed in four classes, based primarily on student-body size. The four classes were called AAA, AA, A and B in 1979. From 1981 through 2003, the four classes were called A, B, C and D. In September 2000, the tournament became known as the Federation Tournament of Champions. Beginning with the 2004 tournament, competition has been held in three classes (AA, A and B).

Venues

After the first two tournaments were held in Syracuse and Rochester in 1979 and 1980, the competition moved to Glens Falls through 2010 and then to Albany. In 2015, because the Times Union Center was used for the NCAA Women's Basketball Albany Regional, the Federation tournament was held at SEFCU Arena, the home court of the University at Albany, SUNY basketball teams. The tournament moved back to Glens Falls in 2017.

Classifications

For 2015, the NYSPHSAA classification enrollment cutoffs were as follows, counting the number of 9th, 10th and 11th grade students in the previous scholastic year (enrollment is doubled for all-boys schools):

 Class AA: 910 and more
 Class A: 480-909
 Class B: 280-479

PSAL, CHSAA and NYSAISAA have their own classification systems, not tied directly to student enrollments.

A school may elect to play in a higher classification, but may not elect to play in a lower classification.

Winners and Runners Up

Results through 2020:

Championships by school

Results through 2020:

Championships by association

Results through 2020:

See also 
List of New York state high school league conferences

References

External links 
 http://www.nysbasketballbrackets.com/

High school basketball competitions in the United States
High school sports in New York (state)
Basketball competitions in New York (state)